This is a list of notable food banks. A food bank is a non-profit, charitable organization that distributes food to those who have difficulty purchasing enough to avoid hunger, usually through intermediaries like food pantries and soup kitchens. Some food banks distribute food directly with their own food pantries.

List of food banks

International

Australia

Canada

China

Colombia

Germany
 Volxküche

India

Israel

Latvia

Malaysia

Nigeria

Singapore

United Kingdom

United States

Arizona

Arkansas

California

Connecticut

Delaware

Florida

Illinois

Indiana

Maine

Maryland

Massachusetts

Michigan

New York

Oregon

Pennsylvania

Texas

Utah

Vermont

Washington

Washington, D.C.

See also

 
 
 food rescue initiatives which are not particularly directed at the poor
  – public foodsharing shelves

References

 
Lists of organizations